Sylvie Corteel is a French mathematician at the Centre national de la recherche scientifique and Paris Diderot University and the University of California, Berkeley, who was an editor-in-chief of the Journal of Combinatorial Theory, Series A. Her research concerns the enumerative combinatorics and algebraic combinatorics of permutations, tableaux, and partitions.

Education and career
After earning an engineering degree in 1996 from the University of Technology of Compiègne, Corteel worked with Carla Savage at North Carolina State University, where she earned a master's degree in 1997. She completed her Ph.D. in 2000 at the University of Paris-Sud under the supervision of Dominique Gouyou-Beauchamps, and earned a habilitation in 2010 at Paris Diderot University.

She worked as a maitresse de conférences and then as a CNRS chargée de recherche at the Versailles Saint-Quentin-en-Yvelines University from 2000 to 2005, also doing postdoctoral studies at the Université du Québec à Montréal in 2001. From 2005 to 2009 she was associated with the University of Paris-Sud, and in 2009 she moved to Paris Diderot, where in 2010 she became a director of research. Since 2017 she has been a Visiting Miller Professor at the University of California, Berkeley. She was named MSRI Simons Professor for 2017-2018.

Along with colleagues O. Mandelshtam and L. Williams, in 2018 Corteel developed a new characterization of both symmetric and nonsymmetric Macdonald polynomials using the combinatorial exclusion process.

Selected publications

References

External links
Home page

Year of birth missing (living people)
Living people
French mathematicians
Women mathematicians
North Carolina State University alumni
Combinatorialists